Madan Mehra (born 13 June 1934) is an Indian former cricketer. He played first-class cricket for Delhi and Railways between 1953 and 1972.

References

External links
 

1934 births
Living people
Indian cricketers
Delhi cricketers
Railways cricketers
People from Pathankot district